Rod Bower (born 30 November 1959) is an Australian cricketer. He played thirteen first-class and nine List A matches for New South Wales between 1983/84 and 1986/87.

See also
 List of New South Wales representative cricketers

References

External links
 

1959 births
Living people
Australian cricketers
New South Wales cricketers
Cricketers from Sydney